Johann Sebastian Bach composed the church cantata  (See to it, that your fear of God be not hypocrisy), 179 in Leipzig for the eleventh Sunday after Trinity and first performed it on 8 August 1723.

History and words 

Bach composed the cantata in his first year in Leipzig, which he had started after Trinity of 1723, for the Eleventh Sunday after Trinity. The prescribed readings for the Sunday were from the First Epistle to the Corinthians, on the gospel of Christ and Paul's duty as an apostle, and from the Gospel of Luke, the parable of the Pharisee and the Tax Collector. The unknown poet stayed close to the gospel and alluded to several Bible passages.

Bach first performed the cantata on 8 August 1723. Alfred Dürr assumes that Mein Herze schwimmt im Blut, BWV 199, composed for the same occasion in Weimar, was also performed in the service.

Scoring and structure 

The cantata in six movements is scored for soprano, tenor and bass soloists, a four-part choir, and a Baroque instrumental ensemble of two oboes da caccia, two violins, viola, and basso continuo.

 Chorus: 
 Recitative (tenor): 
 Aria (tenor): 
 Recitative (bass): 
 Aria (soprano): 
 Chorale:

Music 
In the opening chorus the instruments go with the voices as in a motet. The words are set in a strict counter-fugue: each entrance is followed by an entrance in inversion. The sequence is concluded by a canonic imitation on a new theme: in the words "" (and do not serve God with a false heart) the falseness is expressed by chromatic. A second expanded fugue presents even more complex counterpoint than the first.

A secco recitative prepares the aria with an accompaniment of the two oboe da caccia and violin I in syncopation, which even the tenor voice picks up in the first part. It is not a da capo aria, as only the ritornello repeats the beginning. The final words of the second recitative end like an arioso to stress "" (so that you can find mercy and aid). The soprano aria expresses like a prayer "" (Beloved God, have mercy). The two oboes da caccia illustrate a movement of supplication even together with the soprano voice.

The final chorale is sung on the melody of ""Wer nur den lieben Gott läßt walten", which Bach used also in his choral cantata BWV 93.

Performances 
The cantata was performed at The Proms of 2007 with the Bach Collegium Japan and soloists Carolyn Sampson, Gerd Türk and Peter Kooy, conducted by Masaaki Suzuki.

Recordings 
 Die Bach Kantate Vol. 46, Helmuth Rilling, Gächinger Kantorei, Bach-Collegium Stuttgart, Arleen Augér, Kurt Equiluz, Wolfgang Schöne, Hänssler 1974
 Bach Cantatas Vol. 4 – Sundays after Trinity I, Karl Richter, Münchener Bach-Chor, Münchener Bach-Orchester, Edith Mathis, Peter Schreier, Dietrich Fischer-Dieskau, Archiv Produktion 1977
 J. S. Bach: Das Kantatenwerk – Sacred Cantatas Vol. 9, Nikolaus Harnoncourt, Tölzer Knabenchor, Concentus Musicus Wien, soloist of the Tölzer Knabenchor, Kurt Equiluz, Robert Holl, Teldec 1988
 J. S. Bach: Complete Cantatas Vol. 6, Ton Koopman, Amsterdam Baroque Orchestra & Choir, Ruth Ziesak, Paul Agnew, Klaus Mertens, Antoine Marchand 1997
 J. S. Bach: Cantatas Vol. 10, Masaaki Suzuki, Bach Collegium Japan, Miah Persson, Makoto Sakurada, Peter Kooy, BIS 1999
 J. S. Bach: Trinity Cantatas II, John Eliot Gardiner, Monteverdi Choir, English Baroque Soloists, Magdalena Kožená, Mark Padmore, Stephan Loges, Archiv Produktion 2000
 J. S. Bach: Cantatas for the Complete Liturgical Year Vol. 5, Sigiswald Kuijken, La Petite Bande, Gerlinde Sämann, Jan Kobow, Jan van der Crabben, Accent 2006

References

Sources 
 
 Siehe zu, dass deine Gottesfurcht nicht Heuchelei sei BWV 179; BC A 121 / Sacred cantata (11th Sunday after Trinity) Bach Digital
 Siehe zu, daß deine Gottesfurcht nicht Heuchelei sei history, scoring, sources for text and music, translations to various languages, discography, discussion, Bach Cantatas Website
 BWV 179 Siehe zu, daß deine Gottesfurcht nicht Heuchelei sei English translation, University of Vermont
 BWV 179 Siehe zu, daß deine Gottesfurcht nicht Heuchelei sei text, scoring, University of Alberta
 Luke Dahn: BWV 179.6 bach-chorales.com

Church cantatas by Johann Sebastian Bach
1723 compositions